Jalloh is a surname. Notable people with the surname include:

 Abubakarr Jalloh, Sierra Leonean politician
Adama Jalloh (born 1993), British photographer
 Alimamy Jalloh (born 1987), Sierra Leonean professional footballer 
 Amadu Jalloh, Sierra Leonean politician
 Mariama Jalloh (born 1986), singer-songwriter of Sierra Leonian birth who lives in Cologne, Germany 
 Oury Jalloh (born 1968), Sierra Leonean asylum seeker who died in Germany - see Death of Oury Jalloh
 Yayah Jalloh (born 1981), Sierra Leonean international footballer

See also
 Diallo
 Djaló
 Jallow

Fula surnames